During the 1994–95 English football season, Fulham F.C. competed in the Division Three.

Final league table

Results
Fulham's score comes first

Legend

Football League Third Division

FA Cup

League Cup

Football League Trophy

Squad

References

Fulham F.C. seasons
Fulham